The Korean National Football Championship was a South Korean football competition for semi-professional and amateur senior football clubs. It was held annually in the second half of the year. This competition was originally one of major club competitions of South Korean football, but its status was undermined after the professional clubs appeared in South Korea with the foundation of the professional league, K League. In 2001, it was merged to the Korean FA Cup.

Champions

List of champions

Titles by club 
The asterisk means co-winners, and the superscript "b" means B team's title.

See also
 List of Korean FA Cup winners
 Korean FA Cup
 All Joseon Football Tournament
 Korean President's Cup
 Korean Semi-professional Football League
 Korean Semi-professional Football Championship

References

External links
National Football Championship at KFA

Football Championship
Football Championship